Bilateral ties exist between Australia and the United Arab Emirates.  The UAE maintains an embassy in Canberra whilst Australia has an embassy in Abu Dhabi and a consulate-general in Dubai.

Diplomatic visits

Visits by United Arab Emirates
In February 2010, UAE foreign minister Sheikh Abdullah bin Zayed Al-Nahyan made a historic first official visit to Australia. During the tour, a memorandum of understanding  on the establishment of a Joint Committee on Consular Affairs was signed by Nahyan and Australian foreign minister Stephen Smith.

Transport links
Emirates Airlines offers direct services from Dubai to Perth, Adelaide, Sydney, Brisbane and Melbourne. Etihad Airways offers direct services from Abu Dhabi to Sydney, Brisbane, Perth and Melbourne.

Military relations
Australia openly supports the United Arab Emirates during the Yemeni Civil War, shipping weapons and ammunitions to provide for Yemeni government's forces and the Saudi-led coalition, which led to criticism among public about Australia's involvement, given high civilian casualties. An Australian retired general, Mike Hindmarsh, is also hired to command the Emirati troops during the war.

Trade

The UAE is identified by Australia as its largest market in the Persian Gulf region.  As of 2008–09, trade between the UAE and Australia was valued to A$5.5 billion. Of this, Australian exports to the UAE were A$3.6 billion, while UAE exports to Australia were A$1.9 billion (including crude petroleum imports worth A$1.7 billion).

Education
The majority of Emiratis residing in Australia are students pursuing education in various Australian universities. Australia is a popular destination to which Emirati students have turned for higher education, with enrolments increasing over the years. As of 2013, there were up to 1,700 Emirati students in Australia. In that same year, there were over 900 Emirati student enrolments for Australia. Many of them are on UAE government scholarships and pursuing postgraduate or PhD degrees. They are concentrated in large cities such as Sydney, Melbourne, Brisbane and Perth. In addition, around 14,000 Emiratis also visit Australia each year for tourism. Migration is made easier by relaxed visa requirements and the extensive aviation links between both countries.

See also
 Australians in the United Arab Emirates

References

External links
 The Council for Australian-Arab Relations (CAAR) - DFAT

 
United Arab Emirates
Bilateral relations of the United Arab Emirates